Eller is an urban quarter of Düsseldorf, part of Borough 8. It is located southeast of the city centre. Eller has been a part of Düsseldorf since the year 1909.

History

Archeological findings tell of a continuous settlement in Eller up from the second century A.D.
There are no indications if it were originally a Roman or Germanic settlement.
Eller was recorded first time in 1218 as "Elnere" in a register of the convent of Gerresheim. In 1151 there was a knight mentioned as Gumpert of Elnere as a sub reeve of the reeve of Hitdorf. He was witness for the City rights of Düsseldorf in 1288.
Nucleus of Eller is today's Alt-Eller (Old Eller).

The neighbouring castle of Eller was mentioned first time in 1309 and enlarged in 1469. It was knocked down in 1826, except for the tower and substituted by a new castle.

Since 1350 there had been a chapel in the castle, but it was the only church in Eller until there was  a Roman Catholic church constructed in the years 1827 to 29 by Anton Walger, planned by Karl Friedrich Schinkel. It was ruptured in 1900 and substituted by a new church.

From 1843 to 1882 the princess Luise of Prussia lived in Eller.
It was the time of the Industrial Revolution. In the year 1870 Eller had 1,000 inhabitants.
Since 1872 two railway lines run across Eller, which has got its own station.
In 1896 Eller got an office of a mayor.

In 1901 Eller got a new catholic church and a new mayor's office, in 1905 a Protestant church.

Eller became a borough of Düsseldorf in 1909. In that year Eller had about 10,000 inhabitants and an area of  6.15 km2.

Eller was widely destroyed in World War II. The central church St. Gertrudis was destroyed nearly completely in 1944. 
WW II ended in Eller on 17 April 1945 when American troops reached it.

Eller was rebuilt and the park of the castle reopened in 1950. Since 1950 the park has been a public one.
Up from the 1950s there were new settlements created in the south of Eller. It got some new catholic churches in that time, but in 1996 one of them was given up.

In 1976 the new comprehensive school Kikweg was constructed in Eller. It was one of the two first comprehensive schools in the state of North Rhine-Westphalia. The building was created in the style of  brutalism. It was debated for a long while.

Sights

  Eller Castle (1824-1826), classicistic Hall with park, created by Maximilian Friedrich Weyhe.
 Mayor's house (1901) in Renaissance Revival style.
 Rom.-Cath. Church St. Gertrud (1900-1901), three nave Gothic Revival basilica of Wilhelm Sültenfuß.
 Lutheran Schlosskirche (Castle Church) (1905), Renaissance Revival building.
Kulturbahnhof Eller (Station of Culture), rural/suburban station from 1872, since 1985 place for cultural  activities

Statistics and infrastructure

 Foreigners rate: 24.1% (2020)
 Population density: 5,427 inhabitants/km2 (2020)
 national highway connection: Cross Düsseldorf-Eller (A46 Wuppertal-Neuss)
 Regional Trains (S-Bahn): 3 lines ( S 1, S 6 and, during the peak hour, S 68)
 Stations: 3 (Eller, Eller Süd, Eller Mitte)
 Tram lines: 1 (705)
 Underground lines: 1 (U75)
 Bus lines: 11 (721, 722, 723, 724, 730, 731, 732, 735, 736, 815, 891)

References

External links 
Düsseldorf-Eller (German)
St. Gertrud mit Kirchenführer und Grundriss (German)
Website des Pfarrverband Eller-Lierenfeld (German)
Messdiener des Pfarrverband Eller-Lierenfeld (German)
Castle Eller venue(German)
Lore-Lorentz-Schule former Kollegschule Kikweg (German)
Dieter-Forte-Gesamtschule (comprehensive school) former comprehensive school Kikweg   (German)

Urban districts and boroughs of Düsseldorf
1909 establishments in Germany